XHCHAL-FM is a community radio station on 98.9 FM in Chalco de Díaz Covarrubias, State of Mexico. It is known as Contacto and owned by the civil association Comunicaciones en Contacto, Cultura y Bienestar Social, A.C.

History
XHCHAL was approved for its concession on September 6, 2017. The frequency had been applied for on May 9, 2016.

References

Radio stations in the State of Mexico
Community radio stations in Mexico
Former pirate radio stations
Radio stations established in 2017